Casey Crabtree is an American politician serving as a member of the South Dakota Senate from the 8th district. Crabtree was appointed to office by Governor Kristi Noem on June 19, 2020, succeeding Jordan Youngberg, who resigned to serve with the South Dakota State Treasurer.

Crabtree and his wife have two children. They live in Madison, South Dakota.

Career 
Crabtree is the Director of Economic Development at Heartland Consumer Power District in Madison, South Dakota.

Electoral Record 
In 2020, Crabtree ran for election to continue representing District 8 in the South Dakota State Senate. He was unopposed in the Republican primary and general election; he received 7,829 votes.

Legislative History

Legislative Leadership 
In 2021, Crabtree was elected by the Senate Republican Caucus to serve as one of four Senate Majority Whips. During this same time he served as Chair of the Senate Commerce and Energy Committee and Vice Chair of the Workforce Housing Needs in SD Interim Committee.

2021 South Dakota Legislative Session 
During the 2021 South Dakota Legislative Session, Crabtree prime sponsored seven pieces of legislation. Topics of that legislation ranged from rural infrastructure to certified registered nurse anesthetists recruitment. Crabtree also co-sponsored 39 pieces of legislation including Senate Concurrent Resolutions in support of keeping the U.S. Supreme Court at nine members and support of removing barriers to country of origin labeling.

2021 South Dakota Special Legislative Sessions 
The Legislature met for two special session in 2021, the first for legislative redistricting and the second to discuss the possible impeachment of Attorney General Jason Ravnsborg. Crabtree, a member of the Senate Legislative Redistricting Committee, was a sponsor of the "Blackbird" map which eventually became the chosen map after the South Dakota House of Representatives' proposed map failed. The new adopted legislative districted would place Crabtree in District 8, comprising Lake, Kingsbury, and parts of Brookings and Kingsbury counties. Crabtree signed the a petition in support of the second special session.

2022 South Dakota Legislative Session

References 

Living people
Republican Party South Dakota state senators
People from Madison, South Dakota
Year of birth missing (living people)